Milla, the Mexican star, is a genus of monocotyledonous plants in the family Asparagaceae, subfamily Brodiaeoideae.  They are native mostly to Mexico, with one species extending into Guatemala, Honduras, Arizona, Texas and New Mexico.

Milla contains ten accepted species:

 Milla biflora Cav. - widespread across most of Mexico plus Arizona, New Mexico, Texas, Guatemala and Honduras
 Milla bryanii  I.M.Johnst. - Coahuila
 Milla delicata H.E.Moore - Guerrero
 Milla filifolia T.M.Howard - Morelos
 Milla magnifica H.E.Moore - Guerrero, Morelos
 Milla mexicana T.M.Howard - Puebla, Oaxaca
 Milla mortoniana H.E.Moore - Guerrero
 Milla oaxacana Ravenna - Oaxaca
 Milla potosina T.M.Howard - San Luis Potosí
 Milla rosea H.E.Moore - Nuevo León

References

External links
Pacific Bulb Society
International Bulb Society Gallery of the World's Bulbs
Conabio ficha informativa

Brodiaeoideae
Asparagaceae genera
Taxa named by Antonio José Cavanilles